Bettencourt is a surname and noble family of Norman French origin. The head of the family in the 14th century, Jean de Béthencourt, organized an expedition to conquer the Canary Islands, resulting in his being made King of the Canary Islands. Though the royal title would be short-lived, it allowed the family to firmly establish itself afterwards in the Azores and Madeira islands. The family is one of the most expansive and established families of the Portuguese nobility, as well as the Spanish nobility

Through the expansion of the Portuguese Empire and Spanish Crown, the family and name spread across the world, mainly throughout Iberian America (Portuguese America and Spanish America), as well as Portuguese Africa.

Variants of the name
Though the spelling Bettencourt is the most widely used and standardized spelling of the family, both in Portuguese and French, other spellings of the name have arisen. Some of these spellings include: Bethancourt/Betancourt, Bettencourt, Béthencourt, Bentancour, Bentancourt, Betancoor, Betancur, Betancurt, Betancurth, Betancor, Betancurt, Betencur, Betancor, Bentancour, Bethancourth and Bittencourt.

Family history 

Bettencourt and Betancourt are originally place-names in Northern France. The place-name element -court (courtyard, courtyard of a farm, farm) is typical of the French provinces, where the Frankish settlements formed an important part of the local population. It is translated from the Old Low Franconian word *hof, meaning "courtyard", "courtyard of a farm", "farm" (Dutch, Old English hof, German Hof).

Bettencourt and Béthencourt correspond with Bettenhoffen, Bettenhof or Bettenhoven found in Alsace, Germany or Flanders.

The first part Betten- is the Germanic personal name (owner's name) Betto.

The surname Bettencourt/Béthencourt with various spellings extended throughout Spain, Portugal and their colonies, after the Norman-French explorer Jean de Béthencourt, who conquered the Canary Islands for Spain and received the title King of the Canary Islands.

To this day, Betancourt and other forms of his surname are quite frequent among Canary Islanders and people of Canary Islander descent, in spite of his death without issue, thanks to the offspring of his nephews who followed him in his conquest, especially Maciot de Bethencourt who acted as King of the Canary Islands after his uncle had returned to France.

Examples include former Cuban president Salvador Cisneros Betancourt, who also was Marquess of Santa Lucía, former Colombian president Belisario Betancur, former Venezuelan president Rómulo Betancourt, and Hermano Pedro de San José de Betancurt, a saint of the Roman Catholic Church. Other modern notables are Venezuelan baseball player Rafael Betancourt, Azorean (Portuguese)-born American musician Nuno Bettencourt, Colombian-French activist/politician Ingrid Betancourt and Uruguayan activist Walner Ademir Bentancour Garin, disappeared by the Uruguayan and Argentinian military juntas in 1976.

People

Bettencourt 
 André Bettencourt – French politician, served as Foreign Minister under President Georges Pompidou
 D.J. Bettencourt – American politician
 Diogo de Barcelos Machado Bettencourt – Portuguese magistrate and politician
 João de Bettencourt de Vasconcelos – Portuguese nobleman and governor
 Liliane Bettencourt – French businesswoman, majority shareholder of L'Oréal, richest woman in history
 Nuno Bettencourt – Portuguese-born American musician
 Paul Bettencourt – American politician, currently Texas Senator from the 7th district
 Tiago Bettencourt – Portuguese singer-songwriter

Betancourt 

Carlos Betancourt – American artist
Carmelo Betancourt – Puerto Rican basketball player
Jeanne Betancourt – American author
Kim Betancourt – American publisher
John Gregory Betancourt – science fiction writer
Mick Betancourt –  writer
Philip Betancourt – American Archaeologist
Nelson Betancourt – West Indian cricketer
Porfirio Armando Betancourt – Honduran footballer
Rafael Betancourt – Major League Baseball pitcher for the Colorado Rockies
Rómulo Betancourt – 47th and 54th President of Venezuela
Sterling Betancourt (born 1930) – Trinidadian musician
Michael Betancourt – critical theorist, art and film historian, and animator
Peter of Saint Joseph Betancur, Spanish saint and missionary
Agustín de Betancourt (1758–1825) – prominent Spanish structural engineer, educator, and urban planner
Íngrid Betancourt – French-Colombian politician
Christian Rogelio Benítez Betancourt – Ecuadorian footballer
Alfredo Betancourt (1914–2013) – Salvadoran writer
Gabriel Betancourt – Colombian politician and father of Íngrid Betancourt

Bethancourt

Joe Bethancourt – American musician
Mat Bethancourt – American musician

Béthencourt
See Béthencourt

Bittencourt 
See Bittencourt.

Other variants 
 Belisario Betancur (1923-2018) Colombian politician
 Jorge Betancur – Nicaraguan footballer
 Rubén Bentancourt – Uruguayan footballer
 Rodrigo Bentancur – Uruguayan footballer

See also
Betancuria, municipality in the Canary Islands, Spain
Bettencourt-Rivière, a French commune in the Somme department
Bettencourt-Saint-Ouen, a French commune in the Somme department
 Béthencourt (disambiguation)

References

 
French-language surnames
Norman-language surnames
Portuguese-language surnames
Portuguese noble families
Spanish-language surnames
Surnames of Norman origin
Toponymic surnames